is a cape in Hokkaidō, located at . It is the de facto southern tip of Hidaka Mountains.

Description 
Hot and cold fronts meet near the cape, thus creating a dense mist which covers the cape for more than 100 days a year. Every year, more than 400,000 tourists visit Cape Erimo. Rare species of Kuril Seals live there.

Asteroid 
The main-belt asteroid 5331 Erimomisaki, discovered by amateur astronomers Kin Endate and Kazuro Watanabe in 1990, was named after Cape Erimo.

Climate

References

External links 

 Natural Beauty of Japan, NHK
 Japan National Tourist Organization
 Erimo-misaki Nearshore Waters

Erimo
Landforms of Hokkaido
Tourist attractions in Hokkaido